The 2014 SEABA Under-18 Championship for Women was the maiden edition of SEABA Championship for young women ages eighteen (18) and below. The qualifying tournament for the 2014 FIBA Asia Under-18 Championship for Women, it was held in Semarang, Indonesia from May 26 to May 29.

Malaysia won their first SEABA Under-18 title after sweeping the tournament and defeating Singapore in the finals, 68–55.

Round robin

Final

Final standings

Awards

References

2014
International women's basketball competitions hosted by Indonesia
2014 in women's basketball
2013–14 in Asian basketball
2013–14 in Malaysian basketball
2013–14 in Indonesian basketball
2013–14 in Singaporean basketball
2014 in Indonesian women's sport